The Embassy of the Islamic Republic of Pakistan in Kyiv is the diplomatic mission of Pakistan in Ukraine.

History 
Pakistan recognized the independence of Ukraine on 31 December 1991. Diplomatic relations were established on 16 March 1992. Pakistan embassy was opened in October 1997 in Kyiv.

Consulate General of Pakistan 
 Consulate General of Pakistan in Odesa, Olgivska, 27 Odesa, Ukraine

Current Ambassador
Noel Israel Khokhar is the current Pakistani Ambassador to Ukraine.

Images 
Embassy of Pakistan in Kyiv, Ukraine.

Previous Ambassadors
 Tariq Farouq Mirza (1997-2000)
 Shamoon Alam Khan (2000-2004)
 Taj Ul Haq (2004-2007)
 Ghazanfar Ali Khan (2007-2010)
 Ahmad Nawaz Saleem Mela (2010 - 2012)
 Wajahat Ali Muftee (2013-2015)
 Athar Abbas (2015-2018)
 Zahid Mubashir Sheikh (2018-2020)
Noel Israel Khokhar (November 2020-)

See also 
 Pakistan-Ukraine relations
 Foreign relations of Pakistan
 Foreign relations of Ukraine
 Diplomatic missions in Ukraine
 Diplomatic missions of Pakistan

References

External links 
 Embassy of Pakistan in Kyiv
 Ministry of Foreign Affairs of Ukraine 

Diplomatic missions in Kyiv
Kyiv
Pakistan–Ukraine relations